Periphoeba is a genus of moths belonging to the subfamily Olethreutinae of the family Tortricidae.

Species
Periphoeba palmodes (Meyrick, 1920)

See also
List of Tortricidae genera

References

External links
tortricidae.com

Tortricidae genera
Olethreutinae